Anna Vladimirovna Bulgakova (born 17 January 1988 in Stavropol, Stavropol Krai) is a female hammer thrower from Russia. Her personal best throw is 73.79 metres, achieved in June 2008 in Krasnodar.

In 2017, she was given a two-year ban for breaking anti-doping regulations. In February 2019, the Court of Arbitration for Sport increased it to a four-year ban, starting from 29 March 2017 and disqualified her results retroactive from 30 June 2013 to 15 August 2015.

International competitions

See also
List of doping cases in athletics

References

External links

1988 births
Living people
Sportspeople from Stavropol
Russian female hammer throwers
Olympic female hammer throwers
Olympic athletes of Russia
Athletes (track and field) at the 2008 Summer Olympics
European Athletics Championships medalists
Russian Athletics Championships winners
Doping cases in athletics
Competitors at the 2007 Summer Universiade